Strandiellum is a monotypic genus of Papuan huntsman spiders containing the single species, Strandiellum wilhelmshafeni. It was first described by G. Kolosváry in 1934, and is found in Papua New Guinea.

See also
 List of Sparassidae species

References

Monotypic Araneomorphae genera
Sparassidae
Spiders of Asia